Karyn Parsons Rockwell (born October 8, 1966) is an American actress, author and comedian. She is best known for her role as Hilary Banks on the NBC sitcom The Fresh Prince of Bel-Air from 1990 to 1996. Parsons also starred in the 1995 film Major Payne opposite Damon Wayans, and in The Job (2001–2002) as Toni.

Early life
Parsons was born on October 8, 1966, in Los Angeles, California. In an interview for Essence in 2008, she described her parentage as biracial. Her mother, Louise Parsons, was an African American from Charleston, South Carolina, and her father, Kenneth B. Parsons, was a British American of English and Welsh descent from Butte, Montana. She attended Santa Monica High School.

Career
Parsons starred as Hilary Banks on the sitcom The Fresh Prince of Bel-Air, which aired on NBC from 1990 to 1996. She co-created, co-produced, co-wrote, and co-starred on the Fox sitcom Lush Life in 1996, which was later canceled after four episodes. In 2001, she starred in the critically acclaimed but short-lived television series The Job with Denis Leary. Besides television, Parsons has starred in several films, particularly in comedies such as Late Nights (1992), Major Payne (1995), and The Ladies Man (2000). Parsons is the founder of the Sweet Blackberry Foundation, which produces animated films and books about unsung black heroes. The first video in the series was about Henry "Box" Brown, a slave who mailed himself to freedom.

Parsons has also published three books for children: a middle-grade novel, How High the Moon (2019), which was loosely inspired by stories of her mother's childhood in the Jim Crow South; and two Sweet Blackberry picture-book biographies about black historical figures, illustrated by R. Gregory Christie: Flying Free (2020) about pioneering aviator Bessie Coleman, and Saving the Day (2021) about inventor Garrett Morgan.

Personal life
Parsons married director Alexandre Rockwell in 2003. Together they have a daughter, Lana, and a son, Nico.

Filmography

Film

Television

Bibliography
 How High the Moon (2019)
 Flying Free (2020)

References

External links
 
 Twitter Profile

1966 births
20th-century American actresses
21st-century American actresses
Actresses from Hollywood, Los Angeles
African-American actresses
American child actresses
American film actresses
American people of English descent
American people of Welsh descent
American television actresses
Television producers from California
American television writers
American voice actresses
American women television producers
American women television writers
Living people
Screenwriters from California
20th-century African-American women
20th-century African-American people
21st-century African-American women
21st-century African-American people